Lashkarian (also Romanized as Lashkarīān; also known as Lashgarīān and Lashgariyān) is a village in Malfejan Rural District, in the Central District of Siahkal County, Gilan Province, Iran. At the 2006 census, its population was 424, in 125 families.

References 

Populated places in Siahkal County